The chief minister of Puducherry is the chief executive of the Indian union territory of Puducherry. In accordance with the Constitution of India, the lieutenant governor is a union territory's de jure head, but de facto executive authority rests with the chief minister. Following elections to the Puducherry Legislative Assembly, the union territory's governor usually invites the party (or coalition) with a majority of seats to form the government. The lieutenant governor appoints the chief minister, whose council of ministers are collectively responsible to the assembly. Given that he has the confidence of the assembly, the chief minister's term is for five years and is subject to no term limits.

Since 1963, Puducherry has had 10 chief ministers. The longest-serving and current chief minister, N. Rangasamy from All India N.R. Congress held the office for over thirteen years in multiple tenure. The former Union Minister of State for Civil Aviation M. O. H. Farook has the second-longest tenure and V. Vaithilingam from Indian National Congress has the third-longest tenure. The inaugural holder Édouard Goubert has the shortest tenure (only 1 year, 71 days). There have been seven instances of president's rule in Puducherry, most recently in 2021.

The current incumbent is N. Rangasamy of the All India N.R. Congress since 7 May 2021.

List of chief ministers of State of Pondicherry (Between 1954 and 1963)

The French settlements in India were in transition period between the de facto transfer day (i.e. 1 November 1954) and the  de jure transfer day (i.e. 16 August 1962). In January 1955, The Indian union government by an order renamed these four French settlements in India as State of Pondicherry. Both these transfer days are official holidays within the UT of Puducherry.

The list of chief ministers:
 1. Maurice Pakkiriswamy Pillai from  17 August 1955 to 13 January 1956
 2. Édouard Goubert from  1956 to 24 October 1958(The chief commissioner rule between 28 October 1958 and August 1959)
 3. V. Venkatasubba Reddiar from  9 September 1959 to 30 June 1963

List of chief ministers of Puducherry UT (since 1963)
The Government of Union Territories Act, 1963 that came into force on 1 July 1963 and the state of Pondicherry got converted into the Union territory with effect from the same day. Also, its Representative Assembly was converted into Legislative Assembly.

Legend

Key
  Resigned
  Assassinated or died in office
  Resigned following a no-confidence motion 
  Returned to office after a previous non-consecutive term

See also
 List of leaders of the opposition in the Puducherry Legislative Assembly
 List of speakers of the Puducherry Legislative Assembly
 List of lieutenant governors of Puducherry
 Puducherry Legislative Assembly
 Pondicherry Representative Assembly
 Elections in Puducherry

Notes
Footnotes

References

See also
 List of lieutenant governors of Puducherry

 
Puducherry
Chief Ministers